The green hemlock needleminer, hemlock leaf miner or baldcypress webworm (Coleotechnites apicitripunctella) is a moth of the family Gelechiidae. It is found in the eastern parts of the United States, as well as eastern Canada.

Description
The larva have a pale, yellowish green body, a slightly orange-brown head and a prothoracic shield (the plate of the first thoracic segment just behind the head). The prothoracic shield has light gray margins on the sides.  There are many small, dark green spots conspicuously displayed along the body. The larva grow up to 7 mm long.

The moth is beige with brown markings.

Life cycle
There is one generation per year.

The larvae feed on Tsuga canadensis (the Canadian or eastern hemlock), and Taxodium distichum (the bald cypress).

Notes

External links
Image
Larval Stage info

Coleotechnites
Leaf miners
Moths described in 1860